Professor Gautam Buddha Das is the former Vice Chancellor of Chittagong Veterinary and Animal Sciences University (CVASU). President Abdul Hamid appointed him for a second term of fours years which started on 8 December 2018.

Biography 
Das born in Chandpur district, Bangladesh. His mother's name is Sabitri Rani Das. And his father's name is Swadesh Ranjan Das.

Das received an honors degree on Animal Husbandry from Bangladesh Agricultural University in 1985. In 1986, he received M.Sc. degree on poultry nutrition. And he did his PhD in 2012 from the same university.

On 22 January 2022, Das was awarded the Ekushey Padak, the second most important award for civilians in Bangladesh.

References 

Bangladesh Agricultural University alumni
1963 births
People from Chandpur District
Living people
Recipients of the Ekushey Padak